John Clarke is a Gaelic footballer from County Down, Northern Ireland. He plays for the Down senior inter-county football team and with his local club St Johns GAA.

Clarke made 108 appearances for Down between League and Championship. He started at full forward and scored a point in the 2010 All-Ireland Football Final where Down were defeated 0-15 to 0-16 by Cork.  A versatile player, He played corner back in 2003 Ulster final draw and subsequent replay defeat to Tyrone. He is the older brother of Martin Clarke .

Club
Clarke back to back Down Minor Football Championships 2000 2001. In 2006 he helped An Riocht to a Division 2 title in the 2007 he helped them to the club's first ever Division 1 title beating Kilcoo. However in 2008 the club lost there title and went back to Division 2. 2009 he collected his second Division 2 title beating Ballyholland Harps 1-14 to 2-08.  Currently plying his trade with Down Division 2 Side St Johns Drumnaquoile after moving from An Riocht in 2015.

Honours
 2 Down Minor Championship 2000 2001
 1 Down Division 1 Football League 2007
 2 Down Division 2 Football League 2006 2009
 1 Ulster Minor Football Championship 1999
 1 All-Ireland Minor Football Championship 1999
 1 Dr McKenna Cup 2008

References

Year of birth missing (living people)
Living people
An Ríocht Gaelic footballers
Down inter-county Gaelic footballers